St. Athanasius of Mouzaki is a Greek Orthodox church located in Kastoria, Greece. It was built in 1383–84 by the brothers Theodore II and Stoya of the house of Muzaka, a noble Albanian family that controlled the city at the time, and dedicated to St. Athanasius It is considered one of the most important monuments of 14th century Kastoria and is the last church built in Kastoria before its annexation by the Ottoman Empire.

Decorations

The church is decorated with scenes of saints dressed in Byzantine clothing, a typical feature of Byzantine iconography. The frescoes are remarkable for depicting for the first time in Byzantine iconography, Jesus Christ and the Virgin Mary in imperial costume. The depiction of Virgin Mary as a queen is an atypical feature for the Byzantine iconography. Another unusual feature of the church is that, despite the fact that St. Alexander is traditionally not included among the ranks of military saints, the church of St Athanasius of Mouzaki is decorated with a portrait of St. Alexander in military clothing.

Legacy
The church influenced greatly the artistic production of Kastoria and the region of Macedonia in the late 14th and early 15th century.

Sources

Religious buildings and structures completed in 1387
14th-century Eastern Orthodox church buildings
Eastern Orthodox church buildings in Greece
Kastoria
Byzantine church buildings in Greece
Buildings and structures in Kastoria (regional unit)
Muzaka family
14th-century architecture in Greece